The office of the President of the Presidency of the Socialist Federal Republic of Yugoslavia existed from the death of the President of the Republic Josip Broz Tito on 4 May 1980 until the dissolution of the country by 1992.

A collective presidency existed in Yugoslavia since amendments to the 1963 Constitution in 1971. In 1974 a new Constitution was adopted which reaffirmed the collective federal presidency consisting of representatives of the six republics, the two autonomous provinces within Serbia and (until 1988) the President of the League of Communists. The 1974 Constitution defined the office of President of the Presidency, but only coming into effect with the disestablishment of the office of President of the Republic. A separate article affirmed Josip Broz Tito with an unlimited mandate which ensured the new President of the Presidency would not come into effect until after his death. Simultaneously an office of Vice President of the Presidency had been in place since 1971 on a rotating annual basis between republican and provincial representatives. When Tito died on 4 May 1980, the then Vice President of the Presidency Lazar Koliševski acceded to the role of President of the Presidency. Subsequent to this the role of President of the Presidency would rotate on an annual basis with each President serving as Vice President the year prior.

List of presidents

See also

 List of heads of state of Yugoslavia
 List of members of the Presidency of Yugoslavia
 President of Yugoslavia
 List of deputy heads of state of Yugoslavia
 Presidency of Bosnia and Herzegovina
 Chairmen of the Presidency of Bosnia and Herzegovina
 President of Croatia
 List of presidents of Croatia
 President of the Presidency of SR Croatia
 President of Serbia and Montenegro
 President of Kosovo
 President of the Republic of Macedonia
 President of Montenegro
 List of presidents of Montenegro
 President of Serbia
 List of presidents of Serbia
 President of the Presidency of SR Serbia
 President of Slovenia
 President of the Presidency of the Socialist Autonomous Province of Vojvodina
 President of the League of Communists of Yugoslavia

References

 
President of the Presidency of Yugoslavia
Yugoslavia
Heads of state
Politics of Yugoslavia
1980 establishments in Yugoslavia